Haripur Khalsa is a village in the Jalandhar district of Punjab state of India

Main Road (Nearest): Phillaur-Nurmahal 14 km
Railway Station (Nearest): Partabpura 2 km
Development Bock: Phillaur
Tehsils: Jalandhar-1, Jalandhar-2, Nakodar, Phillaur,  Shahpur
Sub Tehsils: Adampur, Bhogpur, Kartarpur, Nur Mahal

Prominent figures from Haripur Khalsa 
Balbir Singh, Sr.

References 

 MyPind.com (Punjabi villages)

Villages in Jalandhar district
Villages in Phillaur tehsil